Podilsk Raion, known until 2015 as Kotovsk Raion, is a raion (district) in Odesa Oblast of Ukraine. Its administrative center is the city of Podilsk. Population: 

On 18 July 2020, as part of the administrative reform of Ukraine, the number of raions of Odesa Oblast was reduced to seven, and the area of Podilsk Raion was significantly expanded.  The January 2020 estimate of the raion population was 
 
In the 2001 census 25.9 percent of its population declared to be Moldovan (Romanian).

On 21 May 2016, Verkhovna Rada adopted decision to rename Kotovsk Raion to Podilsk Raion and Kotovsk to Podilsk according to the law prohibiting names of Communist origin.

Administrative division

Current
After the reform in July 2020, the raion consisted of 12 hromadas:
 Ananiv urban hromada with the administration in the city of Ananiv, transferred from Ananiv Raion;
 Balta urban hromada
 Dolynske rural hromada with the administration in the selo of Dolynske;
 Kodyma urban hromada
 Kuialnyk rural hromada with the administration in the selo of Kuialnyk, retained from Podilsk raion;
 Liubashivka settlement hromada
 Okny settlement hromada
 Pishchana rural hromada
 Podilsk urban hromada with the administration in the city of Podilsk, transferred from the city of oblast significance of Podilsk;  
 Savran settlement htromada
 Slobidka settlement hromada
 Zelenohirske settlement hromada

Before 2020

Before the 2020 reform, the raion consisted of one hromada, Kuialnyk rural hromada with the administration in Kuialnyk.

References

External links

Raions of Odesa Oblast
Romanian communities in Ukraine

1923 establishments in Ukraine